A California Christmas: City Lights is a 2021 American Christmas romantic comedy film created for Netflix, directed by Shaun Paul Piccinino, written by Lauren Swickard and starring Lauren Swickard, Josh Swickard and Amanda Detmer. It's a sequel to the 2020 film A California Christmas. Its story follows Callie and Joseph who one year after falling in love are now running a dairy farm and winery, however business and family obligations threaten their relationship as Joseph is called back to the city. The film was released on December 16, 2021.

Plot
One year after the previous film, Callie and Joseph are still on the farm and he proposes to her, which she accepts. That evening, everyone celebrates the engagement, and his chauffeur insists that the city misses Joseph, which he finds hard to believe. The following morning, Joseph finds out his mother ran off with her yoga instructor and has left the company to him, much to his dismay. After finding out a woman named Victoria has been appointed temporary CEO, Joseph is mad as he can't stand her. Joseph agrees to go back to the city so some time with Callie after learning his mother was inspired by Callie and Joseph's love to find her own. Brandy comes to visit Callie earlier than expected after hearing about her engagement to Joseph, but mistakes Manny for her fiancé, much to the guy's confusion. Joseph walks over and Callie introduces him as her fiancé to Brandy, making things slightly awkward.

Later, Joeseph tells Callie he must head back to San Francisco for a while and asks her to come along. Callie agrees, leaving Manny and Brandy to look after Hannah. In San Francisco, Callie starts to enjoy the city life and later that evening at a hotel, Callie is introduced to Victoria, who tells her she can help her if needed. Callie learns that Joseph's mother booked a wedding venue for them when she found out he was going to propose. Joseph tells Callie that the date has also been set for Christmas Eve, much to her shock as they haven't been engaged very long, but she says she will think about it.

Meanwhile on the farm, Manny develops a crush on Brandy and back at the city after speaking to Brandy, Callie decides she wants to get married on Christmas Eve. Callie and Joseph attend a party where she is overwhelmed by all the people but still enjoys her time. Back on the farm, Manny and Brandy bond over a video game and almost kiss before they stop themselves. The following morning, Brandy kisses Manny.  In San Francisco, Joseph struggles with being the CEO of his family company and Callie helps out with ideas to make it successful. Callie starts to adapt to and enjoy the city life as he and Joseph plan their wedding. Manny and Brandy start to date as she gets closer to Hannah, Callie's sister.

Callie confronts Joseph after she feels that he is getting too attached to his old life as CEO of his dad's company and Hannah is upset that Callie hasn't contacted her so Manny comforts her, cheers her up. Callie spends time with Owen and helps him in his play where he plays Joseph, and she plays Mary. Joseph and Callie have a fight about the wedding, and she hands back the ring. Back on the farm, Manny confesses his love for Brandy, which she reciprocates.

Callie is picked up by Brandy and they talk about Joseph, Brandy reminds Callie that Joseph left his city life behind for a year because he loved Callie. Joseph speaks to Leo, who stops Joseph from throwing away the engagement ring. Back on the farm, Hannah is distant with Callie as she is still upset about Callie being in San Francisco. Manny and Brandy tell Callie they are dating, which she is overjoyed about. Callie and Hannah make amends and reconcile. Joseph speaks to his mother, who convinces him to do the right thing, while Callie visits her mother's grave.

Joseph cancels the gala and reconciles with Callie, who wants to marry him, and he makes up with his ex-fiancée. Callie and Joseph marry at the vineyard, with flashbacks of their relationship. The film ends nine months later when Callie is in labor.

Cast

Production 
In December 2020, it was reported that the sequel to A California Christmas had entered a pre-production, and would begin filming in 2021. In addition to Petaluma, California, the city where the original was filmed, parts of the film were also shot in San Francisco.

Reception

Critical reception 
John Serba of Decider was critical of the film's dialogue and plot, calling it "cornball holiday schmaltz" and comparing it negatively to Hallmark Christmas movies. Jennifer Green of Common Sense Media gave the film 3 out of 5 stars, concluding that it was "easy to watch" but rehashed much of the previous film. Markos Papadatos of Digital Journal gave the film four out of five stars, praising its script, direction and cast.

Audience viewership 
In its opening week, the film logged 22.8 million viewing hours and reached Netflix's Top 10 list in 73 countries around the world.

See also
 List of Christmas films

References

External links 
 
 

2021 films
2021 comedy films
2021 romantic comedy films
English-language Netflix original films
American Christmas comedy films
American Christmas comedy-drama films
2020s Christmas comedy films
Films directed by Shaun Piccinino
2020s English-language films
2020s American films